Rita Gerle (fl. 1771–1784), was a Spanish textile worker.  

She was married to the silk printer Josep Lavila, who in 1771 founded a silk printing factory in the city of Barcelona, Spain's commercial center of the time. She learned the trade from her husband, who was the student of Isidro Catala.  When her spouse fell sick and became unable to work, she took over the business. She became involved in a legal struggle with the authorities when she applied for a permit to manage the business in her own name, as women were formally barred from the profession – although many worked in the industry illegally. 

In 1784, she became the first woman in Spain to be given formal approval and certification of her trade as a silk printer by the guilds, which was unique, and a new title was created for her, "approved mistress".

References

Year of birth missing
Year of death missing
18th-century Spanish businesspeople